Tarantini is a surname. It may refer to: 

 Alberto Tarantini (born 1955), Argentine footballer 
 George Tarantini (1949–2019), American soccer coach
 Michele Massimo Tarantini (born 1942), Italian film director
 Tarantini (Portuguese footballer), Ricardo José Vaz Alves Monteiro (born 1983)

See also 
 Tarantino (surname)

Italian-language surnames